The 2004–05 Iowa Hawkeyes men's basketball team represented the University of Iowa as members of the Big Ten Conference during the 2004–05 NCAA Division I men's basketball season. The team was led by sixth-year head coach Steve Alford and played their home games at Carver–Hawkeye Arena. They finished the season 21–12 overall and 7–9 in Big Ten play. The Hawkeyes received an at-large bid to the NCAA tournament as #10 seed in the Austin Regional. The season ended with an opening round loss to #7 seed Cincinnati, 76–64.

Roster

Schedule/Results

|-
!colspan=8| Non-conference regular season
|-

|-
!colspan=8| Big Ten Regular Season
|-

|-
!colspan=8| Big Ten tournament

|-
!colspan=8| NCAA tournament

Rankings

References

Iowa Hawkeyes
Iowa
Iowa Hawkeyes men's basketball seasons
2004 in sports in Iowa
2005 in sports in Iowa